Electronic Design magazine, founded in 1952, is an electronics and electrical engineering trade magazine and website.

History 

Hayden Publishing Company began publishing the bi-weekly magazine Electronic Design in December 1952, and was later published by InformaUSA, Inc.

In 1986, Verenigde Nederlandse Uitgeverijen, purchased Hayden Publishing Inc.

In June 1988, Verenigde Nederlandse Uitgeverijen, purchased Electronic Design from McGraw-Hill.
In July 1989, Penton Media, purchased Electronic Design, then in Hasbrouck, N.J., from Verenigde Nederlandse Uitgeverijen.

In July 2007, Penton Media's OEM electronics publication, EE Product News, merged with Penton Media's "Electronic Design" magazine. EE Product News was founded in 1941, as a monthly publication.

In September 2016, Informa, purchased Penton Media, including Electronic Design.

In November 2019, Endeavor Business Media purchased Electronic Design from Informa.

Content 

Sections include Technology Reports (products), Engineering Essentials (new standards), Engineering Features (events), and Embedded in Electronic Design (embedded hardware and software). Design Solutions are contributed by field engineers and Ideas For Design are submitted by readers. Electronic Design also covers components. Techview presents news and products in the categories of Analog & Power, Digital, Electronic design automation, Communications, Test, and Wireless. The magazine covers emerging technologies and large-scale trends.

Six "big" issues are published per year. The Technology Forecast issue is published in January. In June, the Megatrends issue describes industry trends. The "Best" issue reviews the year's "best" designs, events and products. "Your Issue" covers topics from the annual reader survey results. "One Powerful Issue" covers  Power and "Wireless Everywhere" covers Wireless.

Editorial staff include: William Wong, Senior Content Director; James Morra, Senior Editor; Cabe Atwell, Technology Editor; Alix Paultre, Editor-at-Large; and David Maliniak, Senior Editor.

Notable contributors 
Bob Pease, was a legendary engineer with National Semiconductor Corporation, who wrote a monthly column, Pease Porridge, about analog electronics, and answered letters.

Distribution 

The publication is free, in print and digital (PDF), for qualified engineers and managers of the industry in North America. It is also available online.

See also 

 EE Times
 EDN
 Electronics (magazine)
 Electronic News

References

External links 

 Electronic Design
 Endeavor Business Media

Engineering magazines
Magazines established in 1952
Professional and trade magazines
Magazines published in New York City
Science and technology magazines published in the United States
Electrical and electronic engineering magazines